The Ministry of States and Frontier Regions ,  wazarat-e- reyasti o sarhadi umoor (abbreviated as SAFRON) is a federal ministry in Pakistan.

The main responsibilities of the ministry are the administrative affairs and development activities in the tribal areas of Pakistan, including Frontier Regions of Pakistan and Federally Administered Tribal Areas (FATA).

Commissionerate for Afghan Refugees
In 1980, the Commissionerate for Afghan Refugees was established in Islamabad under SAFRON. This was in response to the influx of refugees from Afghanistan to Pakistan from 1979, due to the Soviet invasion and factional fighting in Afghanistan. 

The main functions of Commissionerate are to manage Afghan refugees and support the provision of basic facilities for the welfare of Afghan refugees, coordinating activities with federal and provincial government, NGOs, and international agencies specially UNHCR.

There is a Commissionerate for Afghan Refugees in each province except Sindh.

Cadet College Razmak

Cadet College Razmak, North Waziristan Agency is an autonomous body of the ministry.

List of Minister for States and Frontier Regions Ministers of Pakistan

See also
 Frontier Regions of Pakistan
 Federally Administered Tribal Areas
 Ministry of Kashmir Affairs & Gilgit Baltistan
 Syed Munir Husain, secretary of the Ministry, 1983 to 1987

External links 
 Ministry of States and Frontier Regions of Pakistan
 Commissionerate for Afghan Refugees Punjab
  Commissionerate for Afghan Refugees KP
Ministry of States and Frontier Regions Official Twitter account

References 

 

States and Frontier